Maryna Zanevska won her maiden WTA Tour singles title, defeating Kristína Kučová in the final, 6–4, 7–6(7–4).

Seeds

Draw

Finals

Top half

Bottom half

Qualifying

Seeds

Qualifiers

Lucky losers

Draw

First qualifier

Second qualifier

Third qualifier

Fourth qualifier

References

Main Draw
Qualifying Draw

WTA Poland Open - Singles